Michael F. Bamberger (born April 15, 1960) is a senior writer for the Fire Pit Collective and the author of multiple books.

Early life
Bamberger was born and raised in Patchogue, New York. He attended its public schools (graduating from Patchogue-Medford High School in 1978), wrote for local newspapers and played golf on nearby public courses. He is married and lives in Philadelphia and is the father of two children.

Career
After graduating from the University of Pennsylvania in 1982, Bamberger became a reporter for the Vineyard Gazette on Martha's Vineyard, Massachusetts. He joined The Philadelphia Inquirer in 1986 and became a senior writer for Sports Illustrated in 1995.
Bamberger is the author of seven nonfiction books and the co-author of one novel.

Wonderland: A Year in the Life of an American High School (2004), chronicles the senior year of a group of high school students. The rights for the book were bought by Paramount, and MTV and Tollin/Robbins Productions were to produce the film, which had tentatively been named Pennsbury.  In 2004, Mike Tollin and Brian Robbins signed with Walt Disney Studios, leaving the status of the project uncertain.

The Man Who Heard Voices: Or, How M. Night Shyamalan Risked His Career on a Fairy Tale (2006), released the same week as the writer-director-producer's film Lady in the Water, profiles him as he develops it.
  
The Swinger (2011), a novel he wrote with fellow Sports Illustrated writer Alan Shipnuck, is a satire of the Tiger Woods sex scandal.

The Second Life of Tiger Woods (2020) covers Woods's win at the 2019 Masters.

He is also the author of four autobiographical books on golf: The Green Road Home (1986), To the Linksland (1992), This Golfing Life (2005) and Men in Green (2015).

Bamberger's play Bart & Fay, about the longtime relationship between Bart Giamatti and Fay Vincent, was performed in 1996 at Philadelphia's Walnut Street Theatre.

References

External links
 Two on Tiger Woods: Journey Back to the Leaderboard by John Paul Newport of The Wall Street Journal
 A review of The Swinger by Janet Maslin of The New York Times, June 30, 2011

1960 births
Living people
American sportswriters
American male non-fiction writers